Bradley B. Meeker (March 13, 1813 – February 19, 1873) was an American jurist, lawyer, and businessman.

Meeker was born March 13, 1813, in Fairfield, Connecticut, to  Joseph and Rhoda Meeker. His family was very poor, despite being descendants of one of their city's founder. Meeker was related to Truman Smith, Senator who inspired him to pursue law and serve in the Minnesota Territorial Supreme Court. With the help of Governor Gideon Tomlinson, Meeker went to Weston Academy and graduated from Yale University in 1802. Meeker practiced law in Richmond, Kentucky, from 1838 to 1845 and in Flemingsburg, Kentucky.

Meeker came to Minnesota Territory in 1848. After making a name for himself in the world of law, Meeker was nominated to serve on the Minnesota Territorial Supreme Court by President Zachary Taylor on March 15, 1849, with the Senate confirming him March 19. He took the oath of office on May 9, 1849. When his four-year term expired on March 18, 1853, Meeker was replaced by President Franklin Pierce when he picked his own justices. Of the three justices on the court at the time (Chief Justice Goodrich, Justice Cooper, and himself), he was the least controversial.

Once he left the Minnesota Territorial Supreme Court, Meeker was elected as a delegate of the Minnesota Constitutional Convention, served as one of the first regents of the University of Minnesota, and was a charter member of the Minnesota Historical Society.
Meeker was a charter member of the Minnesota Historical Society and also served on the University of Minnesota Board of Regents. He owned land on the Mississippi River, including Meeker Island named after him. In 1856, he had a county named in his honour.

Meeker died suddenly in Milwaukee, Wisconsin, of Apoplexy while on a trip on February 19, 1873. He was never married to anybody. He currently rests at the Greens Farms Church Upper Cemetery in Westport, Connecticut.

References

1813 births
1873 deaths
People from Fairfield, Connecticut
Yale University alumni
Kentucky lawyers
Businesspeople from Minnesota
Minnesota Territory judges
19th-century American judges
19th-century American businesspeople
19th-century American lawyers